Stourport-on-Severn railway station was the main station in Stourport-on-Severn, Worcestershire, England.

The station, originally named 'Stourport', opened on 1 February 1862 as part of the Severn Valley Railway. It had two platforms and a passing loop from opening. It was renamed Stourport-on-Severn in October 1934, possibly to avoid confusion with the nearby town of Stourbridge.

The station closed when passenger services between Hartlebury and Bewdley were withdrawn on 5 January 1970. Although the line to Hartlebury remained open to coal traffic to the former Stourport Power Station until 1982 when it was closed after closure of the power station.

The site is now occupied by housing development although there is a footpath on the former line to Hartlebury and towards the former Stourport Power Station. The trackbed towards Bewdley is now hemmed in by modern development and no longer traceable other than near Bewdley end.

References

Further reading

External links
"Bewdley to Hartlebury Junction Disused Railway". Shropshire Railways, YouTube video.

Disused railway stations in Worcestershire
Railway stations in Great Britain opened in 1862
Railway stations in Great Britain closed in 1970
Former Great Western Railway stations
Stourport-on-Severn